This list of Hungarians by net worth article consists ranks that claims to be the list of the richest Hungarians according to the individual's net worth. Some of the following lists of Hungarian millionaires and billionaires are based on an annual assessment of wealth and assets compiled and published by Forbes magazine.

Hungarians by net worth in 2017 by Forbes

Hungarian expats by net worth in 2017

Hungarians by net worth on the turn of the 19th century by Forbes

See also
 Economy of Hungary
 List of Hungarian companies

References

Hungarian billionaires
Wealth in Hungary
Economy of Hungary
19th-century Hungarian businesspeople
Hun